Mystery is the eponymous debut EP by the Canadian rock band Mystery, released in 1992. Their shortest recording so far, it contains only 5 tracks. This album is also Mystery's only record that was not released by Unicorn Digital at the time of its original release, and the original 500 print run was out of print for several years until it was remixed and re-released in August 2022.

Production

Background
In the winter of 1991 Raymond Savoie was replaced as lead vocalist by his brother Gary. "In my Dreams" is the only released track with Raymond singing lead vocals, while the rest of the album features Gary in that role. For the album Theatre of the Mind, "In my Dreams" was re-recorded with Gary singing lead, and the compilation At the Dawn of a New Millennium features the version from Theatre of the Mind.

Recording
On the 16 track 2 inch master tapes that were digitized for the 30th anniversary edition, one additional song was recorded called "Follow Your Destiny". While the instruments were recorded, no vocals were recorded.

Track listing

Personnel
 Michel St-Père - electric and acoustic guitars, keyboards
 Richard Addison - bass guitar
 Benoît Dupuis - keyboards
 Stéphane Perreault - drums & percussion
 Gary Savoie - vocals (tracks 1-3 and 5)
 Raymond Savoie - vocals (track 4)

Release information
 CD - PAGI Records - MYSC-1001 - 1992
 CD - Unicorn Digital - UNCR-5099 - 2022

References

1992 debut EPs
Mystery (band) EPs